Roberto Heredero (born 16 December 1950) is a former Cuban cyclist. He competed in the individual and team pursuit events at the 1972 Summer Olympics.

References

External links
 

1950 births
Living people
Cuban male cyclists
Olympic cyclists of Cuba
Cyclists at the 1972 Summer Olympics
Place of birth missing (living people)